Randy Hutchison (born August 25, 1948 - Newport News, Virginia, USA) is a retired NASCAR Winston Cup Series driver who raced a grand total of 1299 laps and  in his career. While his career was brief, Hutchison is most notable for his only top-ten finish at the 1971 Sandlapper 200. This driver had an average career start of 18th place and a career average finish of 19th place.

References

1948 births
Living people
NASCAR drivers
Sportspeople from Newport News, Virginia
Racing drivers from Virginia